James J. Brasco (February 3, 1931 – March 21, 2014) was an American basketball player.

Curiosity 
 He played collegiately for New York University.
 He was selected by the Syracuse Nationals in the 1952 NBA draft.
 He played for the Nationals and the Milwaukee Hawks (1952–53) in the NBA for 20 games.

References

External links

1931 births
2014 deaths
American men's basketball players
Basketball players from New York City
Guards (basketball)
Milwaukee Hawks players
NYU Violets men's basketball players
Sportspeople from Brooklyn
Syracuse Nationals draft picks
Syracuse Nationals players
Elmira Colonels (basketball) players
Abraham Lincoln High School (Brooklyn) alumni
American Basketball League (1925–1955) players